Soeung Samnang is a Cambodian air force officer. He serves as Commander of the Royal Cambodian Air Force .

In March 2018, he was promoted to deputy commander-in-chief of the Royal Cambodian Armed Forces.

References 

Living people
Place of birth missing (living people)
Cambodian generals
Cambodian aviators
1954 births